Criss Angel (born Christopher Nicholas Sarantakos, December 19, 1967 in East Meadow, New York) is an American musician, and magician.

Discography 
All of these albums were self-released under APITRAG Records.

References

External links 
 Official web sites
 Official Criss Angel website
 Official Criss Angel Mindfreak website at A&E

Discographies of American artists
Rock music discographies